is the 14th studio album by Japanese singer/songwriter Yōko Oginome. Released through Victor Entertainment on November 21, 1992, the album was produced by Keisuke Tsukimitsu, who also produced Oginome's previous album Ryūkō Kashu. It was also Oginome's first studio album to not generate a single. The album was reissued on May 26, 2010, with five bonus tracks as part of Oginome's 25th anniversary celebration.

The album peaked at No. 27 on Oricon's albums chart and sold over 26,000 copies.

Track listing 
All tracks are arranged by Yukio Sugai, Kōichi Kaminaga, and Ryujin Inoue, except where indicated.

Personnel
 Hitoshi Takaba – keyboards
 Kōichi Kaminaga – guitar
 Yukio Sugai – bass, drums
 Masato Honda – saxophone
 Ryujin Inoue – backing vocals
 Yumi Murata – backing vocals

Charts

References

External links
 
 
 

1992 albums
Yōko Oginome albums
Japanese-language albums
Victor Entertainment albums